Pioneros de Querétaro (English: Querétaro Pioneers) are an American football team based in Querétaro City, Mexico. The Pioneros compete in Fútbol Americano de México (FAM). The team plays its home games at the Unidad Deportiva El Pueblito.

History
Pioneros was founded in December 2018 as one of the charter members of Fútbol Americano de México (FAM), a minor-professional American football league in Mexico. Gene Dahlquist was appointed as the team's first head coach. Nevertheless, Dahlquist left the team after two games citing personal reasons and was replaced with Rassielh López.

In their first season, Pioneros won the FAM championship after defeating the Centauros de Ciudad Juárez 16–0. A few months later, it was announced that the team would join the Liga de Fútbol Americano Profesional (LFA) for the 2020 season, as the ninth team of the LFA.

For the 2020 season, Pioneros signed several players, including American quarterback Ryan Pahos. In their LFA debut game, Pioneros lost against the 2019 champion, Condors, 7–29. 

In 2021, the LFA and the Pioneros Querétaro parted ways.

Later, the Pioneros returned to the FAM.

Roster

Staff

Season-by-season

Notable players
 Ramiro Pruneda – OT

References

American football teams in Mexico
2018 establishments in Mexico
American football teams established in 2018
Sports teams in Querétaro